In mathematics, a polynomial sequence, i.e., a sequence of polynomials indexed by non-negative integers  in which the index of each polynomial equals its degree, is said to be of binomial type if it satisfies the sequence of identities

Many such sequences exist.  The set of all such sequences forms a Lie group under the operation of umbral composition, explained below. Every sequence of binomial type may be expressed in terms of the Bell polynomials. Every sequence of binomial type is a Sheffer sequence (but most Sheffer sequences are not of binomial type).  Polynomial sequences put on firm footing the vague 19th century notions of umbral calculus.

Examples
 In consequence of this definition the binomial theorem can be stated by saying that the sequence  is of binomial type.
 The sequence of "lower factorials" is defined by(In the theory of special functions, this same notation denotes upper factorials, but this present usage is universal among combinatorialists.) The product is understood to be 1 if n = 0, since it is in that case an empty product.  This polynomial sequence is of binomial type.
 Similarly the "upper factorials"are a polynomial sequence of binomial type.
 The Abel polynomialsare a polynomial sequence of binomial type.
 The Touchard polynomialswhere  is the number of partitions of a set of size  into  disjoint non-empty subsets, is a polynomial sequence of binomial type.  Eric Temple Bell called these the "exponential polynomials" and that term is also sometimes seen in the literature.  The coefficients  are "Stirling numbers of the second kind".  This sequence has a curious connection with the Poisson distribution: If  is a random variable with a Poisson distribution with expected value  then .  In particular, when , we see that the th moment of the Poisson distribution with expected value  is the number of partitions of a set of size , called the th Bell number.  This fact about the th moment of that particular Poisson distribution is "Dobinski's formula".

Characterization by delta operators
It can be shown that a polynomial sequence { pn(x) : n = 0, 1, 2, … } is of binomial type if and only if all three of the following conditions hold:

 The linear transformation on the space of polynomials in x that is characterized byis shift-equivariant, and
 p0(x) = 1 for all x, and
 pn(0) = 0 for n > 0.

(The statement that this operator is shift-equivariant is the same as saying that the polynomial sequence is a Sheffer sequence; the set of sequences of binomial type is properly included within the set of Sheffer sequences.)

Delta operators
That linear transformation is clearly a delta operator, i.e., a shift-equivariant linear transformation on the space of polynomials in x that reduces degrees of polynomials by 1.  The most obvious examples of delta operators are difference operators and differentiation.  It can be shown that every delta operator can be written as a power series of the form

where D is differentiation (note that the lower bound of summation is 1).  Each delta operator Q has a unique sequence of "basic polynomials", i.e., a polynomial sequence satisfying

It was shown in 1973 by Rota, Kahaner, and Odlyzko, that a polynomial sequence is of binomial type if and only if it is the sequence of basic polynomials of some delta operator.  Therefore, this paragraph amounts to a recipe for generating as many polynomial sequences of binomial type as one may wish.

Characterization by Bell polynomials
For any sequence a1, a2, a3, … of scalars, let

where Bn,k(a1, …, an−k+1) is the Bell polynomial.  Then this polynomial sequence is of binomial type.  Note that for each n ≥ 1,

Here is the main result of this section:

Theorem: All polynomial sequences of binomial type are of this form.

A result in Mullin and Rota, repeated in Rota, Kahaner, and Odlyzko (see References below) states that every polynomial sequence { pn(x) }n of binomial type is determined by the sequence { pn′(0) }n, but those sources do not mention Bell polynomials.

This sequence of scalars is also related to the delta operator.  Let

Then

is the delta operator of this sequence.

Characterization by a convolution identity
For sequences an, bn, n = 0, 1, 2, …, define a sort of convolution by

Let  be the nth term of the sequence

Then for any sequence ai, i = 0, 1, 2, ..., with a0 = 0, the sequence defined by p0(x) = 1 and

for n ≥ 1, is of binomial type, and every sequence of binomial type is of this form.

Characterization by generating functions
Polynomial sequences of binomial type are precisely those whose generating functions are formal (not necessarily convergent) power series of the form

where f(t) is a formal power series whose constant term is zero and whose first-degree term is not zero.  It can be shown by the use of the power-series version of Faà di Bruno's formula that

The delta operator of the sequence is f−1(D), so that

A way to think about these generating functions
The coefficients in the product of two formal power series

and

are

(see also Cauchy product).  If we think of x as a parameter indexing a family of such power series, then the binomial identity says in effect that the power series indexed by x + y is the product of those indexed by x and by y.  Thus the x is the argument to a function that maps sums to products: an exponential function

where f(t) has the form given above.

Umbral composition of polynomial sequences
The set of all polynomial sequences of binomial type is a group in which the group operation is "umbral composition" of polynomial sequences.  That operation is defined as follows.  Suppose { pn(x) : n = 0, 1, 2, 3, ... } and { qn(x) : n = 0, 1, 2, 3, ... } are polynomial sequences, and

Then the umbral composition p o q is the polynomial sequence whose nth term is

(the subscript n appears in pn, since this is the n term of that sequence, but not in q, since this refers to the sequence as a whole rather than one of its terms).

With the delta operator defined by a power series in D as above, the natural bijection between delta operators and polynomial sequences of binomial type, also defined above, is a group isomorphism, in which the group operation on power series is formal composition of formal power series.

Cumulants and moments
The sequence κn of coefficients of the first-degree terms in a polynomial sequence of binomial type may be termed the cumulants of the polynomial sequence.  It can be shown that the whole polynomial sequence of binomial type is determined by its cumulants, in a way discussed in the article titled cumulant.  Thus

 the nth cumulant

and

 the nth moment.

These are "formal" cumulants and "formal" moments, as opposed to cumulants of a probability distribution and moments of a probability distribution.

Let

be the (formal) cumulant-generating function.  Then

is the delta operator associated with the polynomial sequence, i.e., we have

Applications
The concept of binomial type has applications in combinatorics, probability, statistics, and a variety of other fields.

See also
 List of factorial and binomial topics
 Binomial-QMF (Daubechies wavelet filters)

References
 G.-C. Rota, D. Kahaner, and A. Odlyzko, "Finite Operator Calculus," Journal of Mathematical Analysis and its Applications, vol. 42, no. 3, June 1973.  Reprinted in the book with the same title, Academic Press, New York, 1975.
 R. Mullin and G.-C. Rota, "On the Foundations of Combinatorial Theory III: Theory of Binomial Enumeration," in Graph Theory and Its Applications, edited by Bernard Harris, Academic Press, New York, 1970.

As the title suggests, the second of the above is explicitly about applications to combinatorial enumeration.

 di Bucchianico, Alessandro.  Probabilistic and Analytical Aspects of the Umbral Calculus, Amsterdam, CWI, 1997.
 

Polynomials
Factorial and binomial topics